Rossendale Borough Council elections are generally held three years out of every four, with a third of the council elected each time. Rossendale Borough Council is the local authority for the non-metropolitan district of Rossendale in Lancashire, England. Since the last boundary changes in 2002, 36 councillors have been elected from 14 wards.

Political control
The first election to the council was held in 1973, initially operating as a shadow authority before coming into its powers on 1 April 1974. Since 1973 political control of the council has been held by the following parties:

Leadership
The leaders of the council since 2004 have been:

Council elections
1973 Rossendale Borough Council election
1976 Rossendale Borough Council election (New ward boundaries)
1979 Rossendale Borough Council election
1980 Rossendale Borough Council election
1982 Rossendale Borough Council election
1983 Rossendale Borough Council election
1984 Rossendale Borough Council election
1986 Rossendale Borough Council election
1987 Rossendale Borough Council election
1988 Rossendale Borough Council election
1990 Rossendale Borough Council election
1991 Rossendale Borough Council election
1992 Rossendale Borough Council election
1994 Rossendale Borough Council election (Borough boundary changes took place but the number of seats remained the same)
1995 Rossendale Borough Council election
1996 Rossendale Borough Council election
1998 Rossendale Borough Council election
1999 Rossendale Borough Council election
2000 Rossendale Borough Council election
2002 Rossendale Borough Council election (New ward boundaries)
2003 Rossendale Borough Council election
2004 Rossendale Borough Council election
2006 Rossendale Borough Council election
2007 Rossendale Borough Council election
2008 Rossendale Borough Council election
2010 Rossendale Borough Council election
2011 Rossendale Borough Council election
2012 Rossendale Borough Council election
2014 Rossendale Borough Council election
2015 Rossendale Borough Council election
2016 Rossendale Borough Council election
2018 Rossendale Borough Council election
2019 Rossendale Borough Council election
2021 Rossendale Borough Council election
2022 Rossendale Borough Council election

Borough result maps

By-election results

References

 By-election results

External links
Rossendale Borough Council

 
Council elections in Lancashire
District council elections in England